The Kimchi Bowl is the final championship game of the Korea American Football Association (KAFA), and was named for kimchi, the national dish of Korea.

The game is considered by players, fans, and organizers to be the Super Bowl of the KAFA.  At its conclusion a trophy is awarded to the winning team's coach and passed amongst the players.  There is also a game MVP trophy awarded to the game's most valuable player.  This honor is decided by the organizers of the game.

The 2007 Kimchi Bowl was won by the Samsung Gryphons.

The 2012 Kimchi Bowl was won by the Seoul Warriors 14–0.

Game results

References

American football bowls
American football in South Korea
American football trophies and awards
1996 establishments in South Korea
Recurring sporting events established in 1996